The Gbo language, known as Legbo or after the people as Agbo, is an Upper Cross River language of Nigeria.

References

Languages of Nigeria
Upper Cross River languages